The 2020–21 season was Colchester United's 84th season in their history and their fifth successive season competing in League Two. Along with competing in League Two, the club also participated in the FA Cup, EFL Cup and EFL Trophy.

Following a promising start to the campaign, Colchester had just one win between 12 December 2020 and 9 April 2021 without a win, propelling them towards the relegation positions. This run of form cost manager Steve Ball his job in February, while his interim replacement Wayne Brown fared little better. Hayden Mullins was promoted to interim head coach on 31 March and a number of wins, including victory against bitter relegation rivals Southend United, aided Colchester to safety in the penultimate game of the season. They finished the season in 20th position, six points clear of the relegation zone.

Colchester were eliminated in the first round of the FA Cup in a penalty shoot-out to Northern Premier League Division One North West side Marine. The U's also lost in the first round of the EFL Cup to Championship club Reading, while they exited the EFL Trophy at the group stage following defeats to Portsmouth and West Ham United under-21s. Despite this, they did earn the largest cup Essex derby victory with a 6–1 win against Southend.

Season overview

Pre-season
Colchester's place in League Two for the 2020–21 season was confirmed on 22 June 2020 following a 3–2 aggregate defeat to Exeter City in the semi-final of the League Two play-offs.

Chairman Robbie Cowling had already announced on 27 April 2020 that four first-team players would be released at the end of their contracts on 30 June. These players included Brandon Comley, Ryan Jackson, Frank Nouble, and club captain Luke Prosser. Citing the COVID-19 pandemic, Cowling admitted under normal circumstances he "would have been determined to re-sign" the released players.

The following day, the club also released a list of twelve further players who would not be offered new deals on the expiry of their current contracts. These included Dean Ager, Callum Anderson, Jamal Campbell-Ryce, Louis Dunne, Chandler Hallett, Tyrique Hyde, Luke Ige, Tariq Issa, Cameron James, Callum Jones, Percy Kiangebeni, and Bailey Vose.

On 14 July, Cowling released a statement to announce that John McGreal had left the club after four years as head coach.

Ethan Ross left the club on 24 July to join League One side Lincoln City.

On 28 July, McGreal's former assistant Steve Ball was announced as his successor.

Colchester played their first pre-season friendly at home to Gillingham on 15 August. They suffered a 2–0 defeat with goals from Stuart O'Keefe and Connor Ogilvie.

On 18 August, Colchester hosted back-to-back friendlies against Ipswich Town, both of which were 75-minutes in length. In the first match, Colchester lost 4–0, with a brace from Aaron Drinan and goals from Gwion Edwards and Idris El Mizouni. In the second game, Colchester were beaten 1–0. Alan Judge's first-half goal proved to be the difference between the sides.

Again the U's hosted back-to-back friendlies, this time the visiting team were Peterborough United. A brace from Dan Butler and one from Siriki Dembélé all but secured victory for Peterborough, before Colchester scored their first goal of pre-season when Jevani Brown earned an 81st-minute consolation. In the second game, a young U's side were defeated by a first-half Ricky-Jade Jones brace.

Following the friendly with Peterborough, Colchester announced the signing of Tommy Smith following his release from Sunderland. He agreed a two-year deal having featured in a number of pre-season friendly matches.

On 28 August, the U's announced their second signing of the summer, former Liverpool goalkeeper Shamal George. He agreed a two-year deal following a trial period.

Colchester fell behind to their National League opposition Wealdstone on 29 August. This followed a melee between the two sets of players which resulted in Wealdstone's Danny Green being sent off. Tom Eastman equalised in the 52nd-minute, and Jevani Brown secured a 2–1 victory ten minutes later.

On 3 September, Colchester announced Steve Ball's assistant would be former Watford coach Hayden Mullins.

On 4 September, Harry Pell was named as Colchester United's new club captain. His vice-captain was newly signed defender Tommy Smith.

Colchester made their third summer signing ahead of the new season with the capture of Fulham striker Martell Taylor-Crossdale. He arrived on a season-long loan from the Premier League club.

September
Colchester played their first competitive match of the season in the first round of the EFL Cup on 5 September when they faced Championship side Reading. Debuts were handed to Tommy Smith and Miquel Scarlett in defence, and Jevani Brown made a return to the Colchester first-team following his loan spell last season at Forest Green Rovers. Brown then scored his first goal for the club in the 37th-minute to give the U's a 1–0 lead, but Reading pulled level with a goal in first-half injury time through Lucas João. He then went on to score two more goals in the second half to seal his hat-trick and send Colchester out of the Cup in the first round. Marley Marshall-Miranda also came on as a second-half substitute to make his professional debut.

Martell Taylor-Crossdale came on as a second-half substitute for his club debut in Colchester's 2–0 EFL Trophy defeat to Portsmouth on 8 September. Also making his debut in goal was Shamal George. Two quick-fire first-half goals from Marcus Harness were enough to secure victory for Pompey.

On 9 September, young forward Michael Fernandes signed for National League South side Dartford on loan until January.

The league season opened with a trip to Valley Parade to face Bradford City on 12 September. The match ended a goalless draw.

Under-23s players Ollie Sims and Matt Weaire were sent out on loan for first-team experience on 18 September until January 2021. Sims joined Southern League Premier South side Farnborough, while centre back Weaire joined Southern League Premier Central side Leiston.

Colchester secured their first win of the season in only their third-ever league meeting with Bolton Wanderers on 19 September. In their first home match of the season, the U's took a first-half lead through Tom Eastman's 44th-minute goal, before doubling their advantage from Jevani Brown's second goal of the campaign after 71-minutes. Sammie McLeod came on as an 83rd-minute substitute to make his professional debut in the 2–0 victory.

The U's were held to a 1–1 draw in their visit to Barrow on 26 September. Noah Chilvers' first professional goal handed the visitors a 1–0 lead after 34-minutes, but the hosts drew level on 54-minutes through Mike Jones.

September ended with a third successive cup defeat of the season for the U's. West Ham United under-21s were 1–0 winners through a 61st-minute Conor Coventry goal. Left back Harvey Sayer made his debut from the substitutes bench during the match.

October
On 3 October, Colchester hosted Oldham Athletic on match day four. Colchester took a 27th-minute lead through Ben Stevenson, who recorded his first goal of the season. Ten minutes later, the U's were two ahead when Callum Harriott doubled their lead from the penalty spot after Conor McAleny's handball offence. McAleny made amends in the second-half, scoring from a penalty kick after Cohen Bramall was deemed to have fouled Dylan Bahamboula. Then two minutes later, Oldham equalised through Carl Piergianni. Colchester retook the lead on 65-minutes from a Miles Welch-Hayes header, but Oldham again equalised in the 89th-minute, McAleny again the scorer.

Noah Chilvers signed a new three-year contract on 5 October to keep him at the club until summer 2023.

Defender Danny Collinge was sent out on loan to Isthmian League North Division side A.F.C. Sudbury on 8 October until January 2021.

On 9 October, Colchester announced the signing of former Manchester United Academy forward Joshua Bohui, who had his contract cancelled at Dutch side NAC Breda earlier in the week. He signed a two-year deal with the club, joining up with Jon De Souza, who he played under at the Brentford Academy.

Colchester were held to a third successive draw on 10 October. Callum Harriott's second goal in as many games had given the U's a first-half lead, but Walsall struck back in the second-half through Elijah Adebayo to draw 1–1.

Ollie Kensdale was loaned out to National League South side Braintree Town, making his debut for the club on 10 October.

Colchester fell to their first defeat of the season on 17 October. Hosts Carlisle United took a 2–0 first-half lead before Luke Norris scored his first goal of the season a minute before the interval. It was 2–2 by the 52nd-minute, Norris converting a penalty kick. However, Carlisle nicked the win with an 81st-minute goal from Aaron Hayden.

Having been on loan at Dartford, Michael Fernandes joined Ollie Sims on loan at Farnborough on 20 October, signing with his former club until January 2021.

The U's returned to winning ways with a 1–0 victory over Forest Green Rovers on 20 October. Noah Chilvers' second-minute goal and second goal of the season was enough to secure the win.

On 24 October, Colchester beat Harrogate Town 2–1 in their first-ever league meeting. Callum Harriott scored his third goal of the season on 52-minutes, before Ben Stevenson followed up two minutes later to double the U's lead. Jon Stead pulled a goal back for the visitors on 61-minutes, but the hosts held on for victory.

Colchester suffered their second league defeat of the season on 27 October at top of the table Newport County. Scott Twine opened the scoring on 51-minutes, but substitute Jevani Brown scored an 89th-minute equaliser for the visitors. In the first minute of injury time, Newport scored their winner through Pádraig Amond.

On 27 October, it was announced that Scunthorpe United had eight players test positive for COVID-19, and their next three fixtures would be postponed, including their match against Colchester originally scheduled for 30 October.

November
Colchester signed former Watford striker Michael Folivi on 2 November on a contract until the end of the season.

Colchester returned to winning ways on 3 November with a 3–1 home win against Stevenage. Jevani Brown scored an 11th-minute opener, before the visitors equalised from the penalty spot four minutes later following a Tommy Smith foul. After the break, Brown added a second in the 57th-minute, and completed his hat-trick in the 81st-minute.

Colchester were knocked out of the FA Cup first round by Northern Premier League Division One North West side Marine on 7 November. The eighth-tier visitors took a 22nd-minute lead through Anthony Miley, but captain Harry Pell brought the U's back into the tie with a 64th-minute equaliser. The resilient Mariners took the tie to extra time, and held out to a penalty shoot-out. Colchester and Marine converted all of their penalties until Josh Bohui stepped up to take United's fourth, which he put wide. Jay Devine scored the subsequent kick and put Marine through to the second round of the Cup for the first time since the 1992–93 season.

In the first Essex derby match since 2018, Colchester faced league rivals Southend United in their final dead rubber EFL Trophy group match on 10 November. Colchester took the lead through leading scorer Jevani Brown after 16-minutes, before he doubled the U's lead after 38-minutes. He secured his second hat-trick in a week after the break when he converted from the penalty spot following a foul on Josh Bohui. Brown was then replaced by Samson Tovide who came on to make his professional debut for the club. Michael Folivi registered his first goal for Colchester to make the score 4–0 on 62-minutes. Noah Chilvers made it 5–0 with 20 minutes remaining, and Kwame Poku scored his first of the season to make it six on 83-minutes. Southend did manage to score a consolation in the second minute of injury time through Kazaiah Sterling. The victory was Colchester's biggest of the season to date, and the largest margin of victory in any Essex derby encounter for either side.

Brown continued his excellent goalscoring form with a brace against Leyton Orient in League Two on 14 November. A goal in each half put the U's in charge, despite the O's scoring a late consolation goal from Conor Wilkinson.

The U's salvaged a late draw against Mansfield Town on 20 November. Nicky Maynard had opened the scoring for the hosts mid-way through the second-half, but Luke Norris' third goal of the season on 85-minutes secured a point for the visitors.

Colchester were thrashed 6–1 by Exeter City on 24 November. Matt Jay's 20th-minute goal gave Exeter a 1–0 lead going into the interval. Steve Ball made three half-time substitutions, but their effect was minimal as the floodgates opened. Joel Randall doubled Exeter's lead on 53-minutes, then Ryan Bowman scored his first of three goals four minutes later. He made it 4–0 on 71-minutes, before Colchester pulled a goal back through substitute Michael Folivi. Bowman completed his hat-trick in the third minute of stoppage time, but Exeter still had enough time to add a sixth when Jay scored his second goal of the game with 95-minutes on the clock.

December
Colchester were held to a draw by Crawley Town on 1 December. The U's had taken the lead through Callum Harriott's 13th-minute goal, but were pegged back by a Jordan Tunnicliffe goal seven minutes later. The scores remained level through the second-half.

The return of supporters to the Colchester Community Stadium on 5 December was overshadowed by a minority of the 1,000 Colchester supporters who booed when the players took a knee prior to kick-off, a gesture that has been commonplace throughout the Premier League and English Football League since June to raise awareness of racial inequality. During the match against Grimsby Town, Colchester took the lead through Tommy Smith, who registered his first goal for the club. Luke Hendrie equalised for the visitors mid-way through the second-half, but Callum Harriott scored his second goal in as many games to secure victory for the U's. The match also saw Junior Tchamadeu make his debut at right-back, becoming the youngest player to start for the club.

Tommy Smith scored his second goal in as many fixtures on 8 December as Colchester held on for a 1–0 victory following his 26th-minute opener at Scunthorpe United. It was Colchester's first away victory of the season.

Colchester came from behind to draw with Port Vale on 12 December. Devante Rodney's 58th-minute goal gave Vale the lead, but Luke Norris struck seven minutes later as the U's held out for a 1–1 away draw.

On 15 December, Colchester were beaten 2–1 at Cambridge United in front of almost 2,000 fans, but the match was overshadowed by a small number of the home supporters booing when players took the knee before kick-off. The home side took the lead through Paul Mullin after 50-minutes, and he scored his second of the game 15-minutes later. Michael Folivi was fouled in the penalty area and stepped up to score, but it was not enough for the U's as they fell to defeat.

On 18 December, the Football Association announced no further action would be taken against Colchester after fans had booed players taking a knee in the home win against Grimsby. They did announce however that an investigation would take place into a similar incident in the Cambridge away fixture.

Colchester's unbeaten home record came to an end as they dropped out of the play-off places with defeat at home to Morecambe on 19 December. John O'Sullivan opened the scoring for the visitors after eight minutes of play, but Michael Folivi scored his second goal in as many games to level the scores on 23-minutes. Yann Songo'o's second-half header would prove to be the winner for Morecambe.

On 21 December, Marley Marshall-Miranda, who had made his first-team debut earlier in the season, signed a new two-and-a-half year contract to keep him with the club until summer 2023.

In their Boxing Day Essex Derby match against Southend United, Colchester were beaten 2–0, with two first-half goals from Simeon Akinola and Timothée Dieng.

Colchester's run of games without a win extended to five on 29 December, when they were held to a goalless draw by Cheltenham Town.

January
Colchester's first scheduled game of 2021 was postponed on the morning of the fixture with Tranmere Rovers due to players in both squads showing symptoms of COVID-19.

On 5 January, striker Luke Norris departed the club to sign for League Two rivals Stevenage.

Yet to play in 2021, Colchester's match at Salford City scheduled for 9 January was postponed on 8 January due to a frozen pitch, with worsening weather conditions expected overnight.

Harvey Sayer, who made his debut for the club earlier in the season, signed his first professional contract with the club on 11 January. His new deal would keep him with the U's until summer 2023.

Colchester played their first game of 2021 on 16 January when they hosted Cambridge United. The visitors took a 12th-minute lead through Harvey Knibbs, but a Greg Taylor own goal on 39-minutes denied the visitors a third consecutive league win as both sides settled for a point.

On 19 January, Colchester signed Queens Park Rangers striker Aramide Oteh on loan for the rest of the season, having been on loan at the U's League Two rivals Stevenage earlier in the season. He was recalled from his Stevenage loan by QPR on 11 January.

Luke Gambin departed Colchester on 20 January to join fellow League Two club Newport County on loan until the end of the campaign.

On 23 January, Colchester fell to a 3–0 defeat at Morecambe. Despite hitting the woodwork twice in the first half, Colchester went into the break a goal down after Adam Phillips' opener on the stroke of half-time. Colchester again conceded in the 58th-minute to a Toumani Diagouraga goal before captain Harry Pell was sent off for an off-the-ball incident on the hour mark. Morecambe scored a third through John O'Sullivan ten minutes from full time.

Colchester were held to a 0–0 draw at Stevenage on 26 January, before suffering yet another defeat to Scunthorpe United on 29 January, who won 1–0 at the Community Stadium.

February
On transfer deadline day, Colchester re-signed Frank Nouble on loan from Plymouth Argyle until the end of the season, while 2019 Charlton Athletic loanee Brendan Sarpong-Wiredu joined the club on a permanent basis. Cohen Bramall left the club to join League One side Lincoln City for an undisclosed fee, while incoming loan signing Josh Doherty from Crawley Town was a direct replacement.

Prior to the transfer window closing, Colchester released seven of their under-23 registered players. These players included Danny Collinge, Michael Fernandes, Ollie Kensdale, Sammie McLeod, Miquel Scarlett, Ollie Sims and Matt Weaire, who all left after cancelling their contracts by mutual consent.

Colchester's rescheduled trip to Salford on 2 February was once again postponed, this time less than one hour before kickoff due to a waterlogged pitch.

Josh Doherty made his Colchester debut on 7 February in Colchester's 0–0 draw at Leyton Orient. Frank Nouble and Brendan Sarpong-Wiredu made their second debuts for the club in the fixture, while Shamal George made his first league start in goal for the U's.

Colchester's home game with Mansfield Town on 13 February was moved back a day to 14 February due to adverse weather conditions. The visitors took the lead when Tommy Smith scored an own goal after just four minutes. The U's were on level terms going into the break through Callum Harriott. James Perch put Mansfield back in front with nine minutes remaining, but Frank Nouble scored his first goal of his loan spell to rescue a point for Colchester in the 89th-minute.

On 20 February, Colchester's winless run extended to 12 games with a 1–0 defeat at Crawley Town. A goal in the third minute of stoppage time ensured yet another defeat for the U's.

Yet again Colchester were beaten on 23 February to leave them fourth from bottom of League Two after Exeter City beat them 2–1 at the Community Stadium. Aramide Oteh scored his first goal for the club, which proved only to be a consolation. Manager Steve Ball parted company with the club following the match amidst a run of 13 games without a win.

On 24 February, Wayne Brown was named interim manager for a second occasion, having previously taken charge of the U's in the 2015–16 season.

Brown's first match in charge ended in a 3–0 defeat to ten-man Forest Green Rovers on 27 February. Colchester trailed by two Jamille Matt goals after 31-minutes, before Rovers had a man sent off in first-half stoppage time. Despite the one man advantage, Colchester could not capitalise, and conceded a third with a Sarpong-Wiredu own goal on 67-minutes.

March
Colchester finally recorded their first victory of 2021, and their first since 8 December with a 2–1 home victory against Carlisle United on 2 March. The U's trailed 1–0 at the break to a Jon Mellish goal, Carlisle then had a penalty decision overturned early in the second half, before Colchester won and converted a penalty of their own. Frank Nouble had been fouled in the area, and Callum Harriott converted. Seven minutes later, Harriott secured his brace, and with it Colchester's first win in 15 matches, despite having a penalty decision of their own overturned later in the game.

However, Colchester returned to their previous form with a 2–0 home defeat by Newport County on 6 March. In the match, Frank Nouble was sent off for a second bookable offence.

Another dreadful display followed on 9 March as Colchester were humbled 3–0 at Harrogate Town, failing to score away from home once again with the U's not recording a goal in 10 hours and 35 minutes.

On 13 March, Colchester played out a 0–0 away draw against bottom club Grimsby Town.

Colchester again saw out another 0–0 away draw, this time at Salford City on 16 March.

A 1–0 home defeat to fellow strugglers Port Vale on 20 March dropped Colchester to 22nd in the League Two table, just seven points clear of the relegation places.

Colchester recorded a point at home to high-flying Tranmere Rovers on 23 March. The U's held a first half lead through Harry Pell's first league goal of the season. Pell then turned provider for Brendan Sarpong-Wiredu in the 55th minute as the midfielder scored his first professional goal. However, Tranmere pulled a goal back from the penalty spot seven minutes later after Tommy Smith was judged to have handled the ball in the area. In the 67th-minute, the visitors levelled through Jay Spearing.

On 27 March, Colchester were beaten 2–1 at home by Bradford City. The visitors took a tenth-minute lead, before Frank Nouble struck three minutes before half-time to level the scores. Andy Cook handed the Bantams all three points with a goal in the 58th-minute.

After only one win in his nine games in charge, Wayne Brown was replaced by Hayden Mullins as interim manager on 31 March.

April
On 1 April, former Exeter City, Milton Keynes Dons and Bristol Rovers manager Paul Tisdale joined the club in an advisory role alongside Mullins until the end of the season.

In Mullins' first game in charge, he led his Colchester side to a 0–0 draw away at high flying Bolton Wanderers on 2 April.

A late equaliser from relegation rivals Barrow denied Mullins his first win in charge of Colchester on 5 April. The U's had taken the lead in the 33rd-minute through Callum Harriott, but Tom Beadling's 88th-minute goal denied Colchester all three points.

On 9 April, Colchester were beaten 5–2 at Oldham Athletic. The hosts had opened up a 3–0 lead by the 56th-minute, before the U's pulled a goal back through Frank Nouble after 64-minutes. Tom Eastman's goal in the 81st-minute gave Colchester hope, but two late goals from Davis Keillor-Dunn secured the win for League Two's highest scoring team.

Colchester earned their first win under Mullins on 17 April when they beat Walsall 2–1 at home. The visitors had taken the lead in the 20th-minute before Michael Folivi's first goal since December levelled the score. In the fourth minute of first-half injury time, Ryan Clampin's volleyed strike handed the U's the lead, and they held on in the second half for the three points.

The U's followed their victory over Walsall up with a 2–0 home win in the Essex derby against Southend United on 20 April. First-half goals from Michael Folivi and Harry Pell secured the win, with Southend having Jason Demetriou sent off in the 69th-minute.

Colchester travelled to second-placed Cheltenham Town on 24 April, but the home side took all three points with an 82nd-minute winner.

May
Colchester confirmed their League Two status on 1 May with a game to spare as they beat nine man Salford City 1–0. Josh Bohui scored his first goal in English football from the substitutes bench to ensure that the U's would finish the season no lower than 22nd in the table.

Colchester played out a goalless draw with Tranmere Rovers on 8 May as they finished the season in 20th position. The match saw the debut of teenage striker Tom Stagg.

Players

Transfers and contracts

In

Out

Loans in

Loans out

Contracts
New contracts and contract extensions.

Match details

Pre-season friendlies
On 13 August 2020, Colchester United announced pre-season home friendlies against Gillingham and Ipswich Town. The first against Gillingham involved players playing no more than 45 minutes each, while the U's hosted two 75-minute long games against Ipswich on the same day. Similarly, Colchester hosted two full friendly matches against Peterborough United on 25 August.

League Two

League table

Results round by round

Matches
The 2020–21 season EFL League Two fixtures were revealed on 21 August 2020.

FA Cup

The draw for the first round was made on 26 October 2020.

EFL Cup

The first round draw for the EFL Cup was made on 18 August 2020.

EFL Trophy

The regional group stage draw for the EFL Trophy was confirmed on 18 August 2020.

Squad statistics

Appearances and goals

|-
!colspan="14"|Players who appeared for Colchester who left during the season

|}

Goalscorers

Disciplinary record

Player debuts
Players making their first-team Colchester United debut in a fully competitive match.

Honours and awards

End-of-season awards

See also
List of Colchester United F.C. seasons

References

2020-21
2020–21 EFL League Two by team